This is a list of governors of Saga Prefecture.
Sadao Koga 1871-1872
Viscount Tesshu Yamaoka 1872
Taku Shigeru 1872-1873
Ishii Kuni 1873
Michitoshi Iwamura 1873-1874
Takatoshi Iwamura 1874
Hidotemo Kitashima 1874-1876
Kamata 1883-1888
Ishii Kuni (2nd time) 1888-1889
Sukeo Kabayama 1889-1892
Takaya Nagamine 1892-1894
Teru Tanabe 1894-1896
Tsunamasa Ōyama 1896-1897
Takeuchi 1897-1898
Yasuhiko Hirayama 1898
Takeuchi (2nd time) 1898
Kiyohide Seki 1898-1901
Fai Kagawa 1901-1908
Inoue Takashihara 1908
Nishimura Mutsu 1908-1911
Fuwa 1911-1914
Raizo Wakabayashi 1914-1915
Ishibashi 1915-1917
Okada 1917
Muneyoshi Oshiba 1917-1919
Sawada Ushimaro 1919-1921
Tominaga 1921-1924
Saito 1924-1926
Nagaura 1926-1927
Ichiro Oshima 1927-1928
Yujiro Shinjo 1928-1929
Tetsuzo Yoshimura 1929
Imajuku Tsugio 1929-1930
Inoue 1930-1931
Nakarai Kiyoshi 1931
Saburo Hayakawa 1931-1933
Nagawa Fujioka 1933-1934
Shizuo Furukawa 1934-1937
Tomoichi Koyama 1937-1939
Kato 1939-1940
Masaki 1940-1941
 1941-1942
Shogo Tanaka 1942-1944
Miyazaki Kenta 1944-1945
Genichi Okimori 1945-1946 
Morio Tozawa 1946-1947
Kuniharu Jinshan 1947
Genichi Okimori (2nd time) 1947-1951
Naotsugu Nebishima 1951-1959
Sunao Ikeda 1959-1979
Kumao Katsuki 1979-1991
Isamu Imoto 1991-2003
Yasushi Furukawa 2003-2014
Yoshinori Yamaguchi 2015–present

 
Saga Prefecture